Large is a 2001 feature film directed by Justin Edgar for FilmFour.

Plot
Large is a gross-out teen comedy which centres on Jason, the son of a fading rock star, and his comic attempts to fulfill the conditions of his father's will in order to inherit a fortune.

Cast
Luke de Woolfson as Jason Mouseley
Simon Lowe as Rob
Phil Cornwell as Barry Blaze Mouseley
Melanie Gutteridge as Sophie
Morwenna Banks as Lorraine
Lee Oakes as Ian
Andrew Grainger as Norman Gates

Production
Large was produced by Alex Usborne. The pre-production period was relatively long, with writers Mike Dent and Justin Edgar draughting 20 versions of the script. Large was filmed and edited at Pebble Mill Studios and on location in director Edgar's hometown of Birmingham, UK, for six weeks in March and April 2000 on a budget of £1.4 million. The line producer was Paul Ritchie (Slumdog Millionaire, Bend It Like Beckham). It was the first film of Director of Photography Robbie Ryan (Fish Tank, Wuthering Heights) and Editor Eddie Hamilton (Kick Ass, X-Men: First Class). It was also Edgar's feature film debut.

Release
Large premiered at the Cannes Film Festival market in May 2001 and was sold for distribution in Spain, France, Germany, Australia and other major territories. It was released on 5 October 2001 (UK) by Pathé.

Reception
The film attracted generally positive reviews with Sight and Sound praising the film's humour and Edgar's magpie sensibilities and energy.
Large was considered a flop on its cinema release but had a highly successful home entertainment release, selling over 30,000 DVDs for distributor Pathé and entering the UK video charts at number 10.

References

External links
 

2001 films
2001 comedy films
British comedy films
2000s English-language films
2000s British films